Víctor Hugo Martínez Contreras (29 March 1930 – 26 August 2020) was a Guatemalan Roman Catholic archbishop.

Martínez Contreras was born in Guatemala and was ordained to the priesthood in 1956. He served as auxiliary bishop of the Roman Catholic Diocese of Huehuetenango, Guatemala, from 1970 to 1975 and as bishop of the diocese from 1975 to 1987. He served as bishop from 1987 to 1996, and then the archbishop of the Roman Catholic Archdiocese of Los Altos, Quetzaltenango-Totonicapán, Guatemala from 1996 to 2007.

Notes

1930 births
2020 deaths
Guatemalan Roman Catholic archbishops
Roman Catholic archbishops in Guatemala
Roman Catholic bishops of Huehuetenango
Roman Catholic archbishops of Los Altos Quetzaltenango-Totonicapán